WLUS-FM is a Country formatted broadcast radio station licensed to Clarksville, Virginia, serving the Southside Virginia area.  WLUS-FM is owned and operated by Thomas Birch's Birch Broadcasting Corporation, through licensee Lakes Media, LLC.

In August 2016, Lakes Media sent an informal objection to the Federal Communications Commission alleging that translator W252DK in Durham, North Carolina was interfering with reception of WLUS-FM. After nearly a year of debate between Arohi Media, licensee of W252DK, and Lakes Media, the FCC sent a letter requiring that the translator cease operation immediately. The translator's license has been suspended and is no longer found in the FCC database.

The FCC has accepted a Petition for Reconsideration filed by Arohi Media on June 1, 2017.

References

External links
 US 98.3 Online
 

LUS
Radio stations established in 1984
Country radio stations in the United States